Kian Scales (born 9 November 2001) is an English professional footballer who plays as a midfielder for Farsley Celtic, on loan from Bradford City.

Career
Scales began his career playing for the Bradford City youth team, joining at the age of 12 or 13. In March 2020 he moved on loan to Bradford (Park Avenue). He turned professional in July 2020, signing a one-year contract.

He made his senior debut for Bradford City on 8 September 2020, in the EFL Trophy. In early December 2020 he spoke about his recent run of first-team action, and the trust placed in City's young players by manager Stuart McCall.

After impressing new managers Mark Trueman and Connor Sellars, on 23 March 2021 Scales made his second league start for the club. He scored his first senior goal on 27 March 2021. The goal was later voted as the club's Goal of the Month for March 2021 by fans.

In April 2021 Sellars said he was happy for young players like Scales and Finn Cousin-Dawson to be playing regular first team football.

On 12 May 2021 he was one of four players offered a new contract by Bradford City. On 16 June 2021 he signed a new two-year contract with the club. In July 2021 he spoke about learning from teammates ahead of the new season.

He was made available for loan to National League clubs in September 2021. He moved on loan to Farsley Celtic in November 2021. After returning from his loan in January 2022, he was made available for loan again.

Ahead of the 2022–23 season he said he was looking forward to more game time, whether with Bradford City or out on loan. He re-joined Farsley Celtic on loan in August 2022. He said he thought his time in non-league would toughen him up for a return to Bradford City. In January 2023 his loan was extended until the end of February, and in February the loan was extended until the end of the season.

Career statistics

References

2001 births
Living people
English footballers
Association football midfielders
Bradford City A.F.C. players
Bradford (Park Avenue) A.F.C. players
Farsley Celtic F.C. players
English Football League players
National League (English football) players